This is a list of parliamentary constituencies in the city of Wolverhampton in the West Midlands of England.

1832–1885
 Wolverhampton (2 seats)

1885–1918
 Wolverhampton East
 Wolverhampton South
 Wolverhampton West

1918-1950
 Bilston
 Wolverhampton East
 Wolverhampton West

1950-1974
 Bilston
 Wolverhampton North East
 Wolverhampton South West

1974–present
 Wolverhampton North East
 Wolverhampton South East
 Wolverhampton South West

See also 
 List of Members of Parliament for Wolverhampton

Wolverhampton
 Wolverhampton